The Bayaya is a mixed and circular dance from the island of Mayotte. The performers form a circle and follow each other, taking steps forward and backward;  the dance is punctuated by the ngôma ensemble (several double-skin drums).  Previously the macheve cowbells that the dancers wore on their feet participated as musical instruments.

Circumstances 
Previously, this dance was practiced during the Msada, a mutual aid, for example during the harvest or the construction of a house.  From now on, it is practiced during festivals or various demonstrations, in particular political.  It is then practiced a little differently since the dancers alternate the circular formation with a row formation when they are on stage in front of the audience.  This dance has become rare

References 

Mahoran culture
African dances